Baroness Therese von Droßdik, née Malfatti (1 January 1792 – 27 April 1851), was an Austrian musician and a close friend of Ludwig van Beethoven. She is best known as one of the possible dedicatees of Beethoven's famous bagatelle, Für Elise, WoO 59.

Biography 
Born in Vienna, Austria on 1 January 1792 (3 weeks after the passing of Mozart) . Therese Malfatti was the daughter of the Viennese merchant Jacob Friedrich Malfatti (1769–1829) and a cousin of the famous and wealthy physician, Johann Baptist Malfatti von Monteregio (1775–1859). Her father, who from 1804 on owned an estate in Walkersdorf am Kamp (Grafenegg), on 2 April 1806 was ennobled and given the title "Edler von Rohrenbach zu Dezza". Her younger sister Anna (1792–1869) married Beethoven's friend Ignaz von Gleichenstein on 29 May 1811 in Etsdorf am Kamp, while Therese was "the object of Beethoven's affection and marriage-project in the year 1810". In April or May 1810 Beethoven wrote to Therese a letter which ended

Now fare you well, respected Therese. I wish you all the good and beautiful things of this life. Bear me in memory—no one can wish you a brighter, happier life than I—even should it be that you care not at all for your devoted servant and friend, Beethoven.".

This was not exactly a love-letter, and it is not certain that Beethoven ever proposed marriage to Therese Malfatti, though some believe that he did. Further, the bagatelle "Für Elise", a song possibly written for Therese, was found among her personal papers.

Baronin Droßdik died in Vienna.

References

Sources 
 Virginia Beahrs: The Beethoven-Malfatti Connection Revisited. In: The Beethoven Journal 13/1, 1998, pp. 12–16.
 Sieghard Brandenburg: Der Freundeskreis der Familie Malfatti in Wien. Gezeichnet von Ludwig Ferdinand Schnorr von Carolsfeld. Beethoven-Haus, Bonn 1985, (Jahresgaben des Vereins Beethoven-Haus 4th year. 1985). (in German)
 Michael Lorenz: "Die 'Enttarnte Elise': Elisabeth Röckels kurze Karriere als Beethovens 'Elise'". In: Bonner Beethoven-Studien 9. Bonn 2011, pp. 169–190. Article online. (in German)
 Michael Lorenz: "Baronin Droßdik und die verschneyten Nachtigallen". Biographische Anmerkungen zu einem Schubert-Dokument. In: Schubert durch die Brille 26, 2001, pp. 47–88.
 Michael Lorenz: Studien zum Schubert-Kreis. Vienna 2001, (Vienna, Ph. Diss., 2001). (in German)
 Ludwig Nohl (Hrsg.): Neue Briefe Beethovens. Nebst einigen ungedruckten Gelegenheitscompositionen und Auszügen aus seinem Tagebuch und seiner Lectüre. Cotta, Stuttgart 1867, S. 28–33. (in German)
 Max Unger: Beethoven and Therese von Malfatti. In: Musical Quarterly 11, 1925, pp. 63–72

1792 births
1851 deaths
19th-century Austrian people
Austrian baronesses
Austrian people of Italian descent
Musicians from Vienna